István Ruják (born 10 June 1958) is a Hungarian sailor. He competed in the Finn event at the 1980 Summer Olympics.

References

External links
 

1958 births
Living people
Hungarian male sailors (sport)
Olympic sailors of Hungary
Sailors at the 1980 Summer Olympics – Finn
Sportspeople from Budapest